= Cemitério Dos Navios =

Beach in Angola, known as Shipwreck Beach

Cemitério Dos Navios Shipwreck Beach
- Shipwreck beach
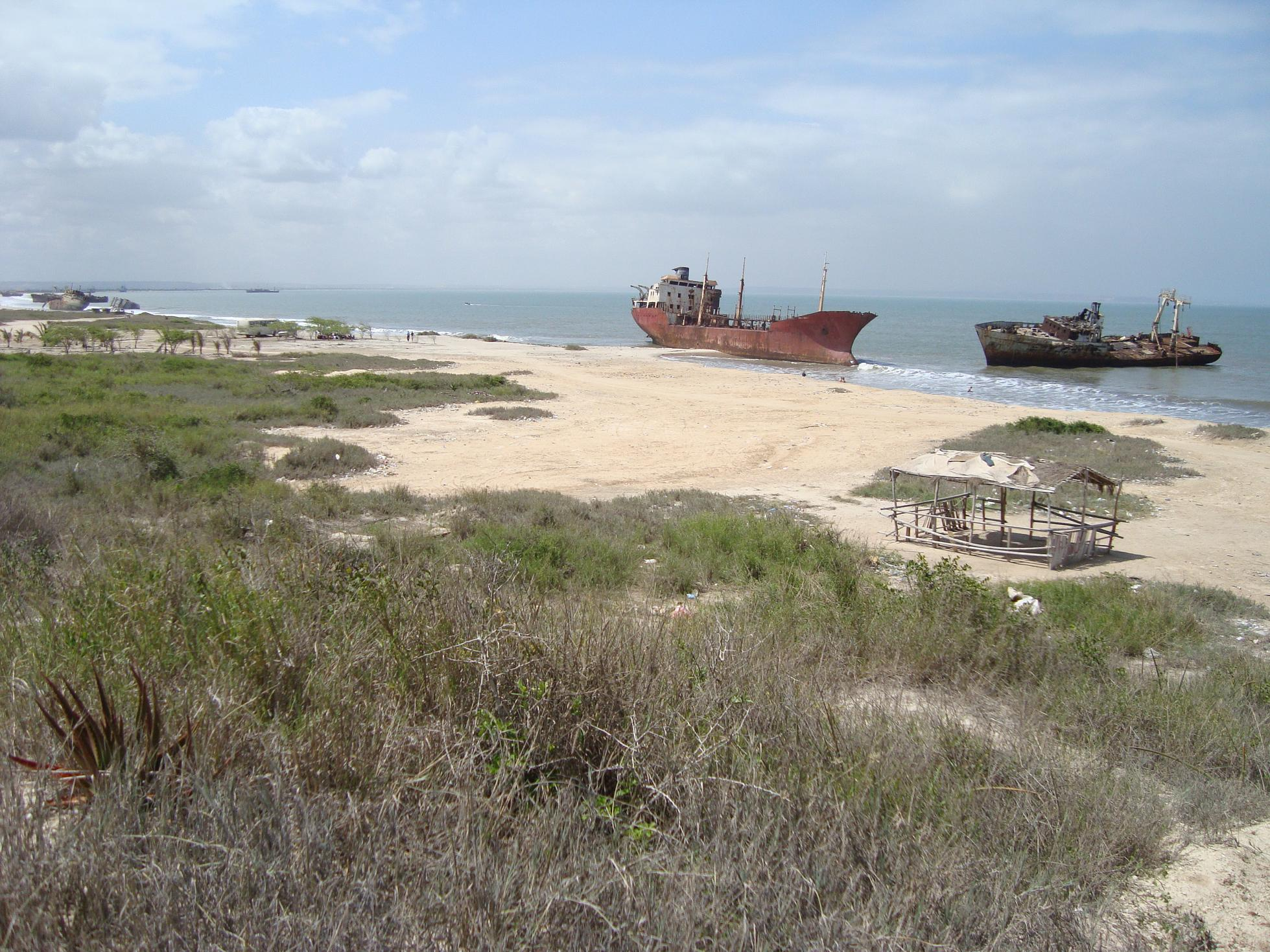
- Overview of the former ship graveyard
- Interactive map of Cemitério Dos Navios
- Coordinates: 8.624603°S 13.413109°E
- Location: Cacuaco, Bengo Province, Angola

Praia do Sarico, Angola, was known until 2023 as Cemitério Dos Navios or Shipwreck Beach. In 2020, the Angolan government ordered the demolition of most of the wrecks, and since 2025 only the keels of the ships have been visible underwater.

== The origins of former Cemitério Dos Navios ==
Since the 1960s, the seaport of Luanda had been home to ships whose shipping companies had gone bankrupt, which had sustained war damage during the Angolan Civil War, which had been abandoned by fleeing owners, or which were no longer seaworthy due to a lack of spare parts. These ships were taking up valuable berths. The port of Luanda has no shipbreaking yards. To keep the port operational, the port authorities deliberately towed these defective vessels to the uninhabited coastline to leave them there to rust away. At least 50 ships ended up on the coast of Cucauco.

== Notable wrecks ==
=== Karl Marx ===
- IMO number: 5186081
- Year of construction: 1959
- Shipyard: Gheorghiu Dej Shipyard (part of the Ganz-Danubius shipbuilding group), located in Budapest/Újpest, Hungary.
- Ship type and dimensions: The vessel belonged to the ELVA class and was a conventional general cargo ship with a registered length of 78.80 metres.
- Flag state and ownership history:
  - 1959 to 1978 (Soviet Union): The ship was originally launched and entered service under the name Keila. During this period, it sailed under the flag of the Soviet Union and was managed by the Estonian State Seashipping Company, with Tallinn as its registered home port.
  - 1978 to 1993 (Angola): In 1978, the vessel was transferred to Angola, after which it was renamed Karl Marx. From that point onwards, it sailed under the Angolan flag and was owned by the Cabotagem Nacional Angolana UEE (the Angolan national coastal shipping company).

=== Joaquim Kapango ===
- IMO number: 7529847
- Year of construction: 1978
- Shipyard: Sociedad Metalúrgica Duro-Felguera, located in Gijón, Spain.
- Ship type and dimensions: Conventional general cargo ship with a gross tonnage of 4,188 tonnes and a maximum deadweight tonnage (Summer DWT) of 7,007 tonnes.
- Flag state and name history:
  - 1978 to 1980: The ship was built and originally entered service under the name Plencia.
  - From 1980: In 1980, the cargo ship was transferred to Angola and renamed Joaquim Kapango (named after the Angolan military officer and politician of the same name). From the time of this transfer, the vessel sailed under the Angolan flag and was used for national logistics and coastal shipping, until it eventually broke down, was taken out of service and left as a wreck in the bay north of Luanda.

== Clean-up of the Cemitério Dos Navios ==
The clearance of shipwrecks at Praia do Sarico forms part of a wider Angolan effort to remove abandoned and dilapidated vessels from the waters around the capital, with the main drivers being the resolution of environmental issues such as asbestos contamination and the improvement of maritime safety. According to Revista Comunidades, the government issued a tender in October 2020 to contract companies to dismantle and remove the scrap and wrecked ships left along Luanda Bay. Following on from this, Portuguese media reported in May 2021 that the graveyard itself was also set to disappear. Euronews announced that the Angolan ship graveyard would soon disappear, describing the site as a pilgrimage destination for photographers but, at the same time, a curse for local fishermen. RTP located the site about forty-five minutes north of Luanda and summarised the problem by noting that the graveyard yields scrap metal rather than fish, whilst at the same time it had become an iconic sight attracting tourists and amateur photographers.

In addition to the involvement of official salvage companies, local residents and scrap dealers have dismantled the steel ships using cutting torches and hand tools to sell the metal on to the steel industry. The logical assumption here is that the organised government projects and the informal scrap collection have, in practice, complemented one another and thereby significantly accelerated the demolition process. Recent travellers’ reports unequivocally confirm that all clearance work has now been fully completed. The well-known ship graveyard has thus physically and permanently disappeared, transforming the site back into a regular sandy beach that is currently used exclusively by the local fishing community.

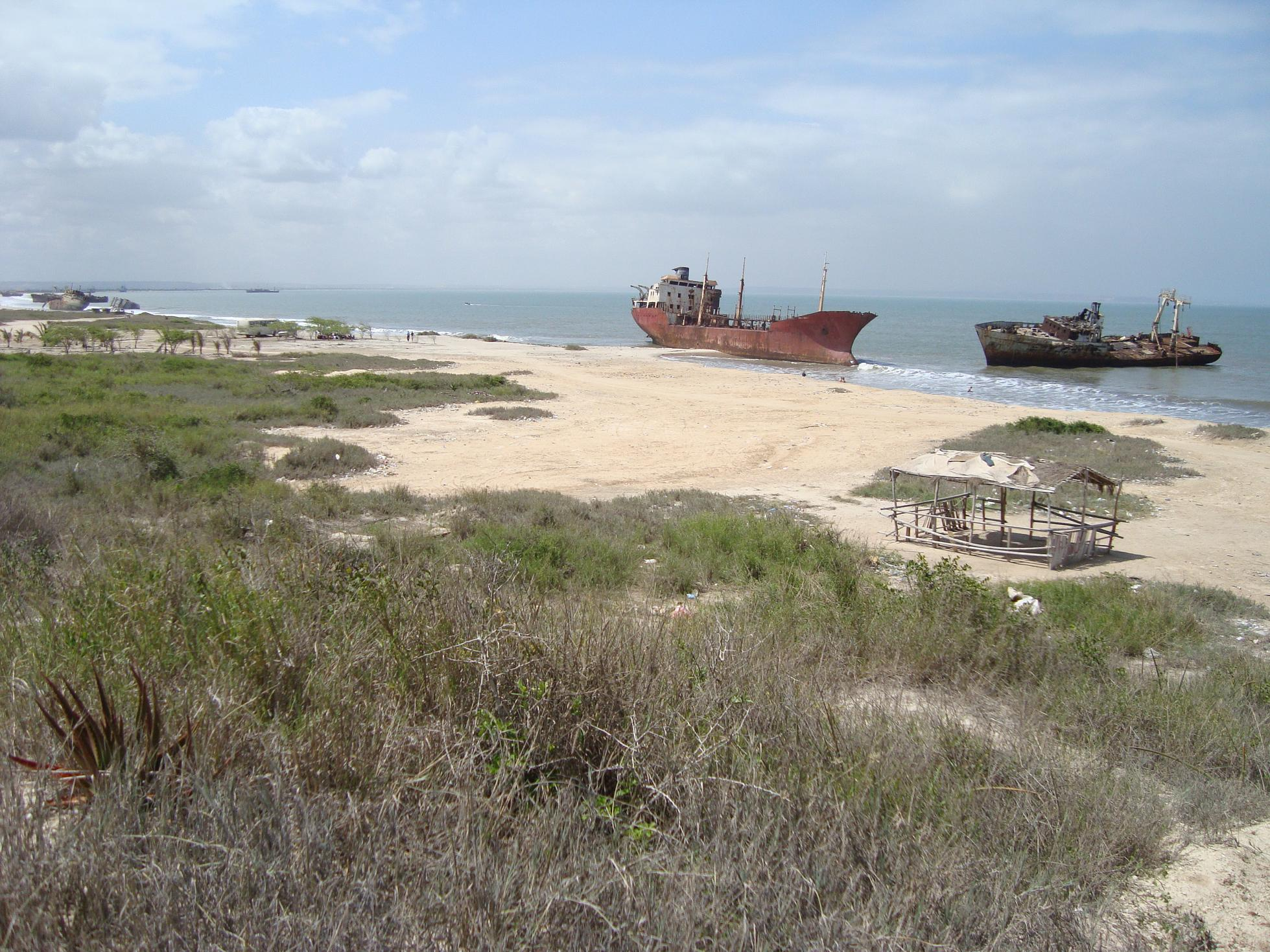
Overview of the former ship graveyard

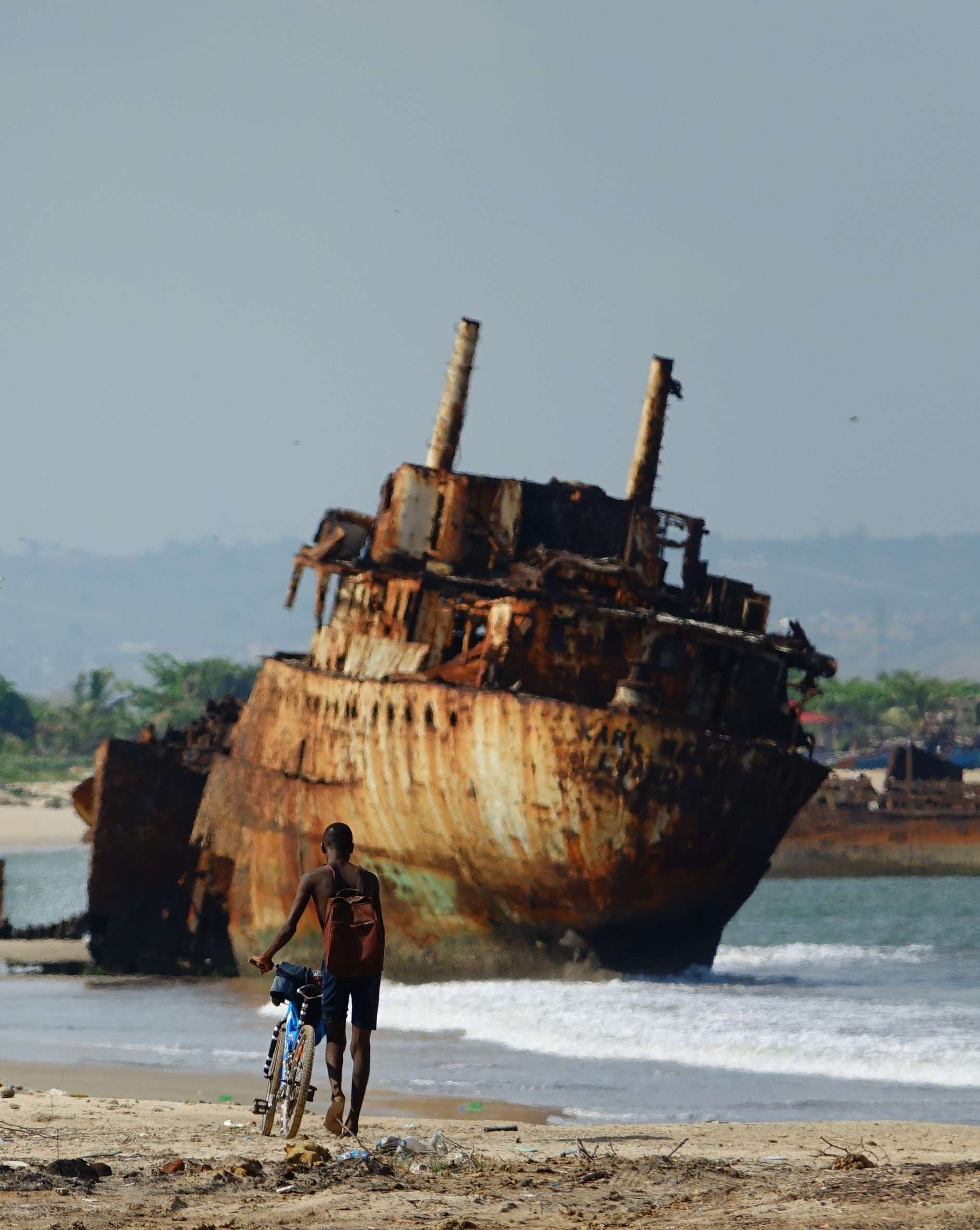
Wreck of the Karl Marx

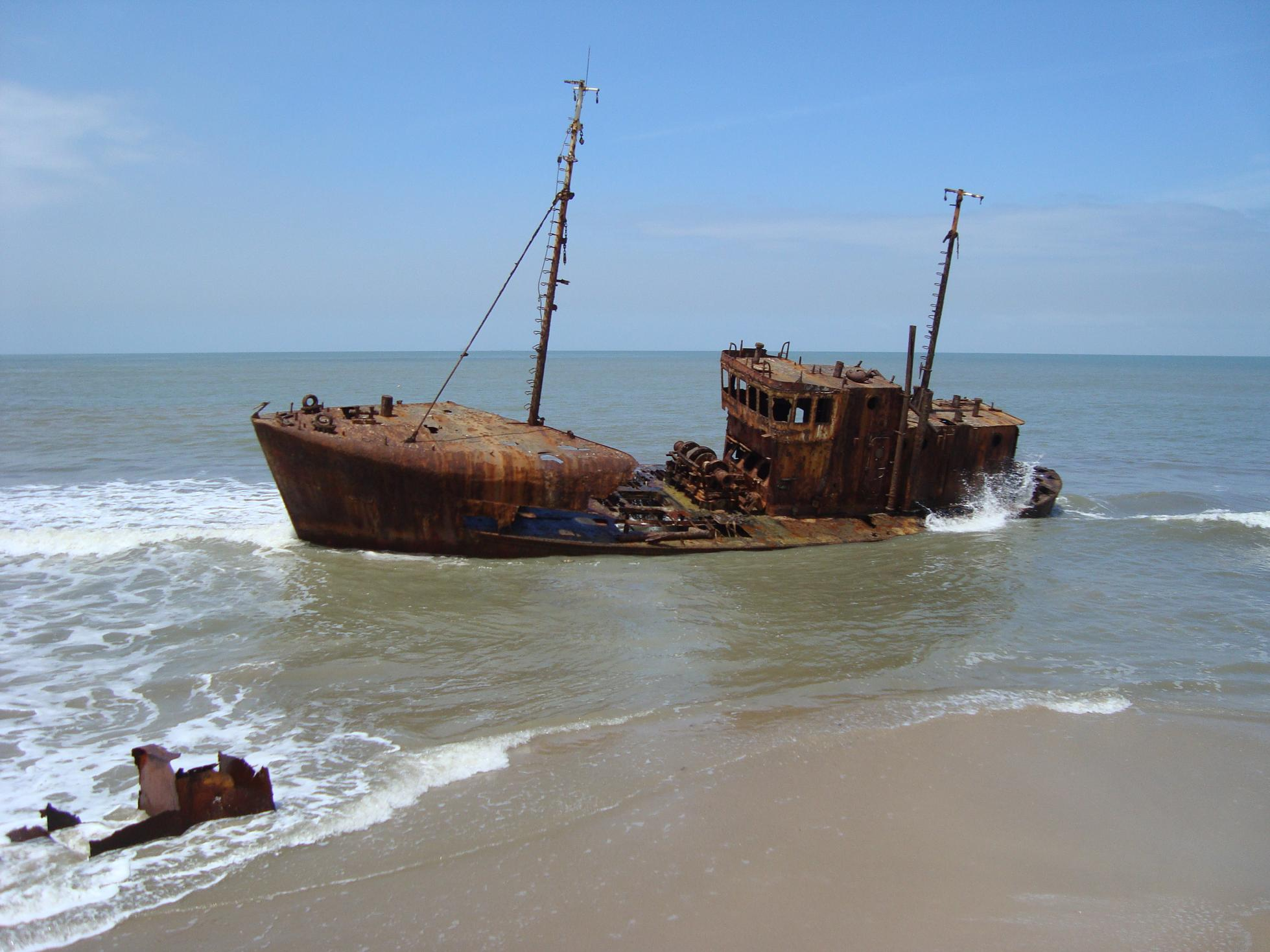
Shipwreck on Praia do Sarico

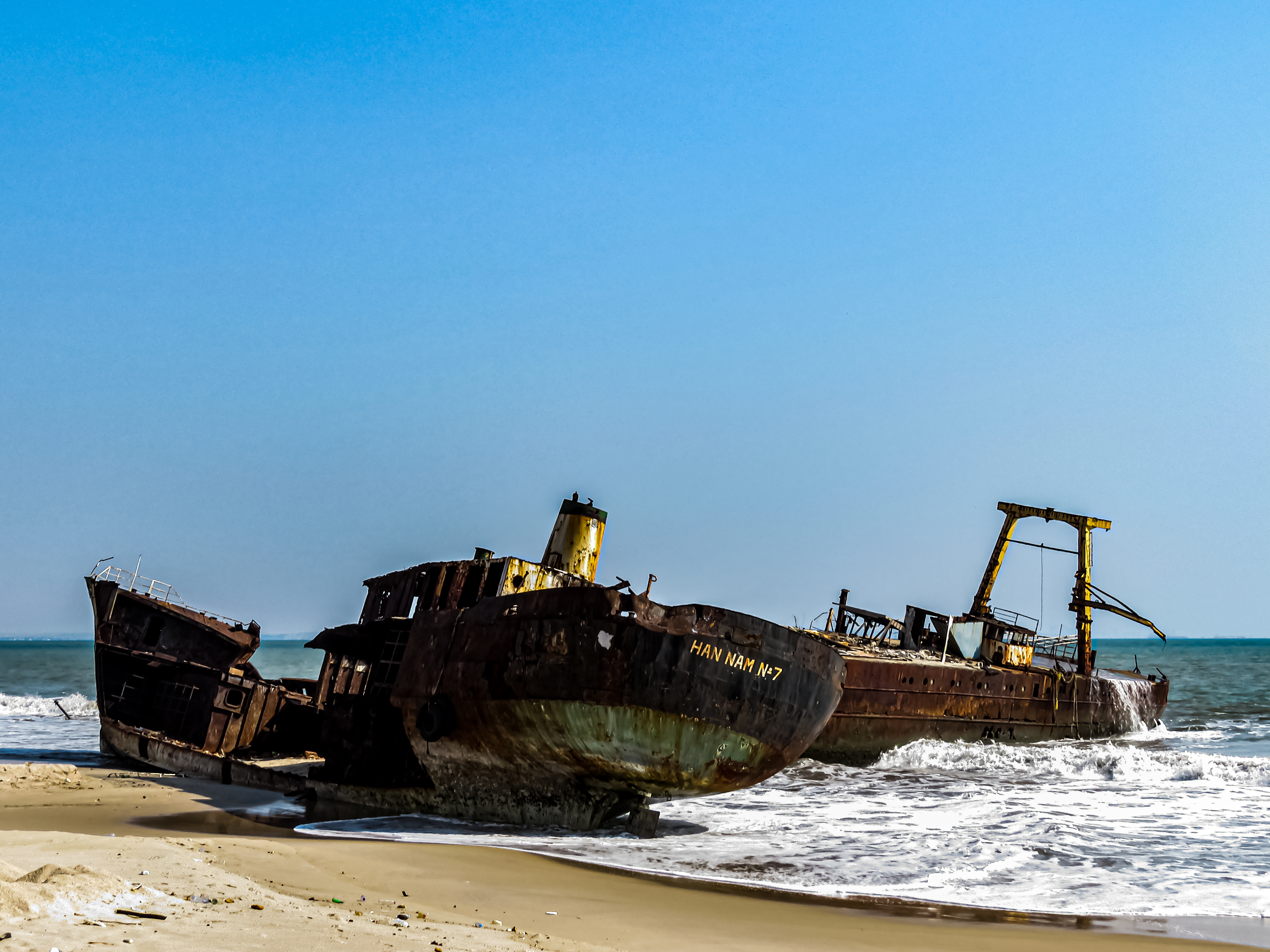
Wreck of the Han Nam N.º 7

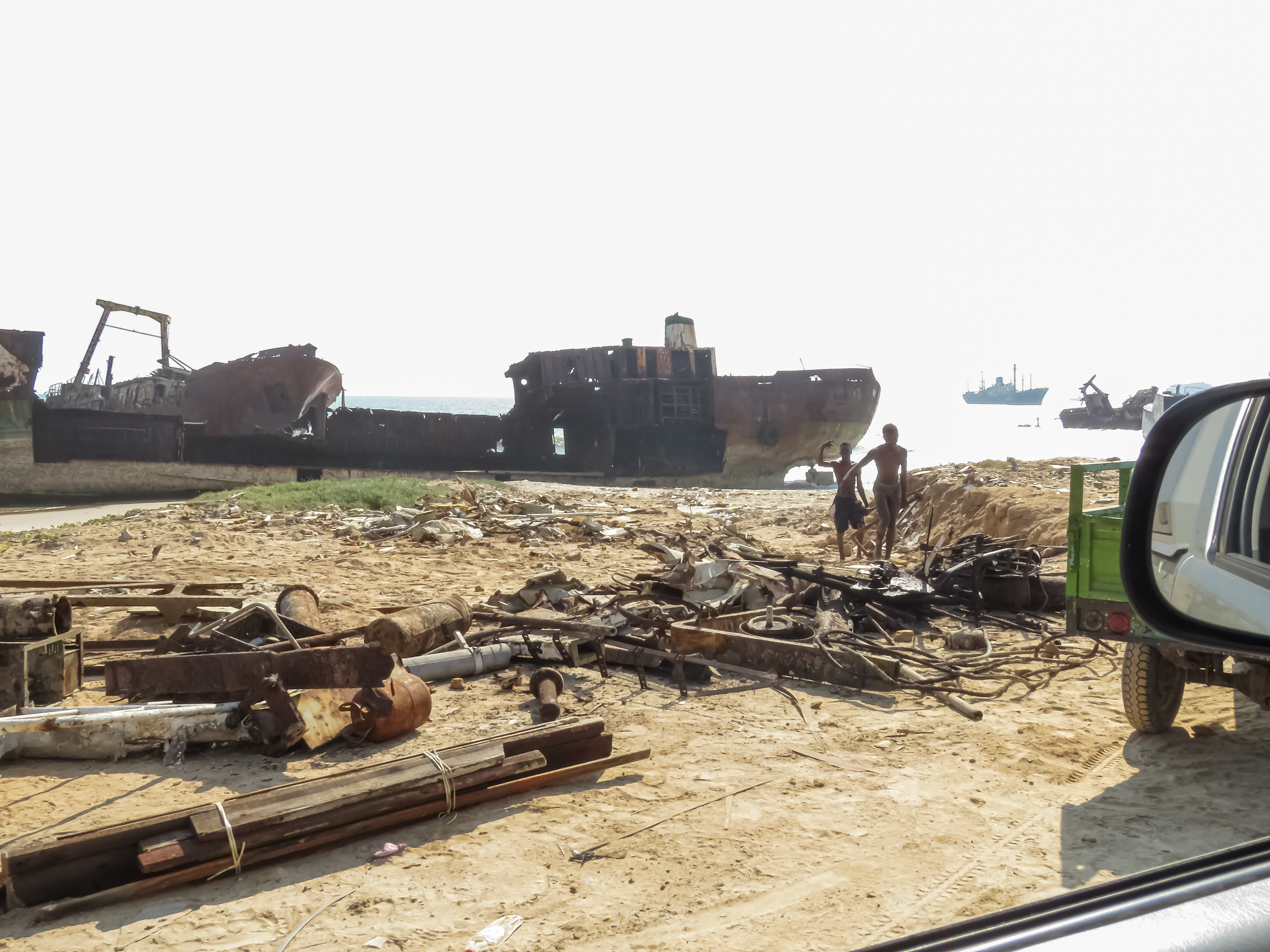
Detail of the rusting ship remains
